Charles Clifton Penick (December 9, 1843 – April 13, 1914) was third missionary bishop of Cape Palmas, Africa, and Parts Adjacent from 1877 to 1883. He attended Hampden-Sydney College in Virginia. He studied divinity at the Virginia Theological Seminary in Alexandria, graduating in 1869. He was  consecrated as a bishop at the Church of the Messiah, Baltimore, on February 13, 1877.

Bibliography
More than a Prophet (New York: Thomas Whittaker, 1881)

References
Obituary in The Living Church, April 25, 1914

External links

 
Church of the Messiah, Baltimore's website

1831 births
1914 deaths
Bishops of the Episcopal Church (United States)
19th-century American Episcopalians
Anglican bishops of Liberia